Manasak Sor Ploenchit (born December 7, 1965, in Klaeng District) is a retired Muay Thai fighter from Thailand.

Biography and career

Manasak was born in the Rayong Province where he started Muay Thai during the mid 1970s. He rapidly reached the Bangkok circuit where he had a few fights under the name Manasak Asawamongkol, he then went back to fight in eastern Thailand where he became regional champion.
Manasak then joined the Sor Ploenchit camp in Bangkok under the teaching of Sathien Sathiensut and became a successful fighter.

During his prime in the 1980s Manasak was knowned as a highly skilled fighter with a complete arsenal and some of the sharpest eyes in the ring. He beat many notable fighters of his era such as Kongtoranee Payakaroon, Saencherng Pinsinchai, Sangtiennoi Sor.Rungroj, Panomtuanlek Hapalang, Jaroenthong Kiatbanchong or Chanchai Sor Tamarangsri.

At his peak Manasak received fight purse as high as 120,000 baht. He shortly retired in early 1986 and came back later that year.

As of 1987 Manasak was a two time Rajadamnern Stadium champion and won the Thailand King's belt.

After his fighting career Manasak went back to his hometown where he owns a shop with his family.

Titles & honours
Rajadamnern Stadium
 1983 Rajadamnern Stadium 118 lbs Champion
 1987 Rajadamnern Stadium 126 lbs Champion
Lumpinee Stadium
 1987 Thailand Champion

Awards
 1987 Sport Writers Association Fight of the Year (vs. Saencherng Naruepai)

Fight record

|-  style="background:#fbb;"
| 1991-07-24 || Loss ||align=left| Nuengsiam Kiatwichian || Rajadamnern Stadium || Bangkok, Thailand || KO || 4 ||
|-  style="background:#fbb;"
| 1991- || Loss ||align=left| Jack Kiatniwat || Rajadamnern Stadium || Bangkok, Thailand || Decision ||5 ||3:00
|-  style="background:#fbb;"
| 1991- || Loss ||align=left| Jack Kiatniwat || Rajadamnern Stadium || Bangkok, Thailand || Decision ||5 ||3:00
|-  style="background:#fbb;"
| 1991-02-20 || Loss ||align=left| Twaeechai Wor. Preecha || Rajadamnern Stadium || Bangkok, Thailand || Decision ||5 ||3:00
|-  style="background:#cfc;"
| 1990-11-23 || Win||align=left| Kyoji Saito || AJKF "INSPIRING WARS 3rd" || Tokyo, Japan || TKO ||5 ||2:23
|-  style="background:#fbb;"
| 1990-11-08 || Loss ||align=left| Nuengsiam Kiatwichian || Rajadamnern Stadium || Bangkok, Thailand || TKO (Doctor Stoppage) || 4 ||
|-  style="background:#c5d2ea;"
| 1990-|| Draw ||align=left| Nuengsiam Kiatwichian || Rajadamnern Stadium || Bangkok, Thailand || Decision || 5 || 3:00
|-  style="background:#fbb;"
| 1990-05-16 || Loss ||align=left| Lakhin Wassandasit|| Rajadamnern Stadium || Bangkok, Thailand || KO || 3 ||
|-  style="background:#c5d2ea;"
| 1990-03-21||Draw ||align=left| Poonsawat Wor.Singsanae || Rajadamnern Stadium || Bangkok, Thailand || Decision || 5 || 3:00
|-  style="background:#cfc;"
| 1990-03-01 || Win ||align=left| Sombat Sor.Thanikul || Rajadamnern Stadium  || Bangkok, Thailand || Decision || 5 || 3:00
|-  style="background:#c5d2ea;"
| 1990-01-29 || Draw||align=left| Sombat Sor.Thanikul || Rajadamnern Stadium  || Bangkok, Thailand || Decision || 5 || 3:00

|-  style="background:#fbb;"
| 1989-09-27 || Loss ||align=left| Jack Kiatniwat || Rajadamnern Stadium  || Bangkok, Thailand || Decision || 5 || 3:00

|-  style="background:#fbb;"
| 1989-08-15 || Loss ||align=left| Namphon Nongkee Pahuyuth|| Lumpinee Stadium|| Bangkok, Thailand || Decision|| 5 || 3:00
|-  style="background:#fbb;"
| 1989-07-09|| Loss ||align=left| Sangtiennoi Sor.Rungroj || Rajadamnern Stadium || Bangkok, Thailand || Decision || 5 || 3:00
|-  style="background:#cfc;"
| 1989-06-03 || Win ||align=left| Jaroenthong Kiatbanchong||  || Trang Province, Thailand || TKO || 3 ||
|-  style="background:#fbb;"
| 1989-05-02 || Loss ||align=left| Saencherng Narupai || Lumpinee Stadium || Bangkok, Thailand || Decision || 5 || 3:00
|-  style="background:#cfc;"
| 1989-04-07|| Win ||align=left| Petchdam Lukborai || Lumpinee Stadium || Bangkok, Thailand || Decision || 5 || 3:00

|-  style="background:#cfc;"
| 1989-03-06|| Win ||align=left| Chanchai Sor Tamarangsri || Lumpinee Stadium || Bangkok, Thailand || Decision || 5 || 3:00

|-  style="background:#cfc;"
| 1988-12-07|| Win||align=left| Sanit Wichitkriangkrai|| Rajadamnern Stadium || Bangkok, Thailand || TKO (Referee Stoppage)|| 4 || 

|-  style="background:#cfc;"
| 1988-09-07|| Win||align=left| Tuanthong Lukdecha ||  || Bangkok, Thailand || Decision || 5 || 3:00

|-  style="background:#fbb;"
| 1988-06-24|| Loss ||align=left| Namphon Nongkeepahuyuth || Lumpinee Stadium || Bangkok, Thailand || Decision || 5 || 3:00

|-  style="background:#fbb;"
| 1988-04-08|| Loss ||align=left| Jomwo Chernyim || Lumpinee Stadium || Bangkok, Thailand || KO || 3 || 

|-  style="background:#fbb;"
| 1988-03-04|| Loss ||align=left| Chanchai Sor Tamarangsri || Lumpinee Stadium || Bangkok, Thailand || Decision || 5 || 3:00

|- style="background:#fbb;"
| 1987-11-27 || Loss ||align=left| Panomtuanlek Hapalang || Lumpinee Stadium ||  Bangkok, Thailand  || Decision || 5 || 3:00
|-
! style=background:white colspan=9 |
|-  style="background:#fbb;"
| 1987-10-27|| Loss ||align=left| Chamuekpet Hapalang || Rajadamnern Stadium || Bangkok, Thailand || Decision || 5 || 3:00
|-  style="background:#c5d2ea;"
| 1987-09-22||Draw ||align=left| Chanchai Sor Tamarangsri || Lumpinee Stadium || Bangkok, Thailand || Decision || 5 || 3:00
|-  style="background:#cfc;"
| 1987-07-31 || Win ||align=left| Panomtuanlek Hapalang ||Lumpinee Stadium || Bangkok, Thailand || KO || 1 ||

|-  style="background:#cfc;"
| 1987-06-19 || Win ||align=left| Saencherng Narupai || Lumpinee Stadium|| Bangkok, Thailand || TKO (Punches)  || 2 ||
|-
! style=background:white colspan=9 |

|- style="background:#cfc;"
| 1987-05-31|| Win ||align=left| Saphanphet Kiatphetnoi || Rajadamnern Stadium ||  Bangkok, Thailand  || Decision || 5 || 3:00
|-
! style=background:white colspan=9 |

|-  style="background:#cfc;"
| 1987-03-23|| Win ||align=left| Sombat Sor.Thanikul || Rajadamnern Stadium || Bangkok, Thailand || Decision || 5 || 3:00

|-  style="background:#cfc;"
| 1987-02-26|| Win ||align=left| Sangtiennoi Sor.Rungroj || Rajadamnern Stadium || Bangkok, Thailand || Decision || 5 || 3:00

|-  style="background:#cfc;"
| 1986-12-22|| Win ||align=left| Kingsaknoi Saknarin ||  || Bangkok, Thailand || Decision || 5 || 3:00

|-  style="background:#fbb;"
| 1986-11-11|| Loss ||align=left| Jomwo Chernyim  || Lumpinee Stadium || Bangkok, Thailand || KO (Punches)|| 3 ||

|-  style="background:#fbb;"
| 1986-04-03|| Loss ||align=left| Jomwo Chernyim  || Lumpinee Stadium || Bangkok, Thailand || Decision || 5 || 3:00

|-  style="background:#cfc;"
| 1986-02-10|| Win ||align=left| Sangtiennoi Sor.Rungroj || Rajadamnern Stadium || Bangkok, Thailand || Decision || 5 || 3:00

|- style="background:#fbb;"
|1985-11-22
|Loss
| align="left" | Jomwo Chernyim
|Rajadamnern Stadium
|Bangkok, Thailand
|Decision
|5
|3:00
|-  style="background:#fbb;"
| 1985-10-24|| Loss ||align=left| Chamuekpet Hapalang || Lumpinee Stadium || Bangkok, Thailand || Decision || 5 || 3:00
|- style="background:#cfc;"
|1985-09-23
|Win
| align="left" | Jampatong Na Nontachai
|Rajadamnern Stadium
|Bangkok, Thailand
|Decision
|5
|3:00
|- style="background:#cfc;"
|1985-09-02
|Win
| align="left" | Jomwo Chernyim
|Rajadamnern Stadium
|Bangkok, Thailand
|Decision
|5
|3:00
|- style="background:#cfc;"
|1985-07-17
|Win
| align="left" | Saencherng Narupai
|Rajadamnern Stadium
|Bangkok, Thailand
|Decision
|5
|3:00
|-  style="background:#cfc;"
| 1985-04-02|| Win ||align=left| Pornsaknoi Sitchang || Lumpinee Stadium || Bangkok, Thailand || Decision || 5 || 3:00
|-  style="background:#cfc;"
| 1985-01-08|| Win ||align=left| Bangkhlanoi Sor.Thanikul || Lumpinee Stadium  || Bangkok, Thailand || Decision || 5 || 3:00
|-  style="background:#fbb;"
| 1984-11-21|| Loss ||align=left| Nikhom Phetphothong || Rajadamnern Stadium || Bangkok, Thailand || Decision || 5 || 3:00
|-
! style=background:white colspan=9 |
|-  style="background:#fbb;"
| 1984-06-29|| Loss ||align=left| Samransak Muangsurin || Lumpinee Stadium || Bangkok, Thailand || KO || 3 ||
|-  style="background:#c5d2ea;"
| 1984-05-10|| Draw ||align=left| Panmongkol Hor.Mahachai || Rajadamnern Stadium || Bangkok, Thailand || Decision || 5 || 3:00
|-  style="background:#cfc;"
| 1984-04-10|| Win ||align=left| Kongtoranee Payakaroon || Lumpinee Stadium || Bangkok, Thailand || Decision || 5 || 3:00

|-  style="background:#cfc;"
| 1984-01-27|| Win ||align=left| Panmongkol Hor.Mahachai ||  || Bangkok, Thailand || Decision || 5 || 3:00
|-  style="background:#cfc;"
| 1983-12-28|| Win ||align=left| Nikhom Phetphothong || Rajadamnern Stadium || Bangkok, Thailand || KO || 3 ||
|-
! style=background:white colspan=9 |
|-  style="background:#cfc;"
| 1983-11-11|| Win ||align=left| Palannoi Kiatanan || || Bangkok, Thailand || Decision || 5 || 3:00
|-  style="background:#fbb;"
| 1983-08-26|| Loss ||align=left| Jakrawan Kiatsakthewan || Lumpinee Stadium || Bangkok, Thailand || Refereee Stoppage || 4 ||
|-  style="background:#cfc;"
| 1983-06-15|| Win ||align=left| Sakchai Singkhiri ||  || Bangkok, Thailand || Decision || 5 || 3:00
|-  style="background:#cfc;"
| 1983-05-25|| Win ||align=left| Piyarat Sor Narongmit ||  || Bangkok, Thailand || Referee Stoppage|| 3 || 
|-  style="background:#fbb;"
| 1983-04-05|| Loss ||align=left| Palannoi Kiatanan || || Bangkok, Thailand || Decision || 5 || 3:00
|-  style="background:#fbb;"
| 1983-03-04|| Loss ||align=left| Jakrawan Kiatsakthewan|| || Bangkok, Thailand || Decision || 5 || 3:00
|-  style="background:#cfc;"
| 1983-01-07|| Win ||align=left| Roengnarong Thairungrueng || Lumpinee Stadium || Bangkok, Thailand || Decision || 5 || 3:00
|-  style="background:#cfc;"
| 1982-12-07|| Win||align=left| Fonluang Luksadetmaephuangthong|| || Bangkok, Thailand || Referee Stoppage || 5 ||
|-  style="background:#cfc;"
| 1982-11-02|| Win ||align=left| Wanmai Phetbundit || || Bangkok, Thailand || KO || 5 ||
|-  style="background:#cfc;"
| 1982-09-07|| Win ||align=left| Falikhit Sitmanathep ||  || Bangkok, Thailand || KO || 3 ||
|-  style="background:#fbb;"
| 1982-07-09|| Loss ||align=left| Sornsil Sitnoenpayom  || Lumpinee Stadium || Bangkok, Thailand || Decision || 5 || 3:00
|-  style="background:#cfc;"
| 1982-06-10|| Win ||align=left| Chanaisuk ||  || Pattaya, Thailand || Decision || 5 || 3:00
|-  style="background:#fbb;"
| 1982-05-19|| Loss ||align=left| Wanmai Phetbundit || Rajadamnern Stadium || Bangkok, Thailand || Decision || 5 || 3:00
|-  style="background:#cfc;"
| 1982-04-07|| Win ||align=left| Arthit Somsakanping ||  || Bangkok, Thailand || Decision || 5 || 3:00
|-  style="background:#cfc;"
| 1982-02-12|| Win ||align=left| Pungthong Fairtex ||  || Bangkok, Thailand || KO || 3 ||
|-  style="background:#cfc;"
| 1981-11-23|| Win ||align=left| Roengchai Thairungrueng ||  || Bangkok, Thailand || Decision || 5 || 3:00

|-
| colspan=9 | Legend:

References

1965 births
Manasak Sor Ploenchit
Living people
Manasak Sor Ploenchit